Bolanle is a Yoruba given name common in Nigeria. Bolanle is a short form of Omobolanle which means "child finds wealth at home".

Notable people with the name Bolanle 

 Bolanle Ambode, First Lady of Lagos State, from 29 May 2015 to 29 May 2019
 Bolanle Austen-Peters, Nigerian movie director
 Bolanle Awe, Nigerian professor
 Bolanle Ninalowo, Nigerian actor and film producer
 Bolanle Olukanni, Nigerian TV presenter
 Olusegun Bolanle Gbeleyi, Nigerian politician

Nigerian names